Salma Khatoon Mikrani is a Nepalese politician. She was a Proportional Representative member of the first Constituent Assembly of Nepal in 2008, representing the Madhesi Jana Adhikar Forum, Nepal party. The party later split into two, and she joined the Jaya Prakash Gupta group, who launched a new political party under the name Madhesi Janaadhikar Forum, Republican in May 2011.

Before the second Constituent Assembly election of 2013, she left the Madhesi Janaadhikar Forum, Republican, and joined the Tarai-Madhesh Loktantrik Party in a programme held by chairman Mahanth Thakur in Janakpur in August 2013. She was the only representative of the Mikrani community in the Nepalese parliament.

Early life
She was born on  25 January 1976 at Kattarban village, Rajdevi vdc, Rautahat District. Her father was Mohammad Shamsul Haque Mikrani, and her mother Jamila Begum Mikrani. She is married to Mohammad Azaz Mikrani, from vdc Bhadsar, Sarlahi, and lives with him in Bharsar-6, Sarlahi.
She actively participated in the Madheshee Movement or Masdhesh agitation in 2006 and 2007, and because of her bravery, sincerity, patience and  courage, the party gave her the opportunity to be the proportional representative of Sarlahi districts.

Passport scam
The Commission for the Investigation of Abuse of Authority (CIAA) of Nepal has investigated cases of the sale of Red (diplomatic) passports by distinguished Constituent Assembly members representing Madhesi Janadhikar Forum. She has been implicated in this affair, along with Shiva Pujan Rai Yadav and Rambha Devi.

References

Living people
1976 births
People from Rautahat District
Madhesi Jana Adhikar Forum, Nepal politicians
Socialist Party of Nepal politicians
Madhesi people
Malangwa
Mikrani People of Nepal
21st-century Nepalese women politicians
21st-century Nepalese politicians
Members of the 1st Nepalese Constituent Assembly